The Ford EXP is a sports compact coupe produced and sold by the Ford Motor Company in North America for the 1982 to 1988 model years. The EXP debuted at the 1981 Chicago Auto Show. It shared many mechanical components with the contemporary Ford Escort.

The first-generation EXP entered production in 1981, and was facelifted during the 1985 model year. The model was dropped after the 1988 model year. In 1989 the two-door, front wheel drive Ford Probe hatchback coupe was launched.

From 1982 to 1983, a version of the EXP was sold by Lincoln-Mercury dealers as the Mercury LN7. The LN7 was dropped after failing to meet sales expectations.

Development 
By 1980 Ford Motor Company had entered a period of major transition. Following the termination of Lee Iaccoca, chairman Henry Ford II retired and Ford's chief stylist, Eugene Bordinat, stepped down as well.

During the late 1970s there had been a push by automobile manufacturers around the world to make small, fuel efficient cars, triggered by the OPEC oil embargo of October 17, 1973–1974. This embargo included a 70% increase in oil prices, causing long lines at gasoline filling stations and skyrocketing prices for gasoline. A second energy crisis and a renewed recession followed from 1979 to 1982.

Ford studied a two-seater commuter car called the Super Gnat. It was to have a three-cylinder engine with a wheelbase of just . Ford also built the Mustang RSX concept car, exploring a slightly smaller two-seat derivative of the Mustang.

To replace the aging Ford Pinto, the company began development on the Ford Escort in the late 1970s. While originally intended to be a "world car", the North American version shared little aside from its engine, suspension, and its name in the final design.

The impetus for developing the EXP came from the company's marketing research. The growing number of one- and two-person households, combined with the lifestyle of the younger target audience who desired a small sporty car, led Ford to conclude that Americans wanted a "lively little car that is dependable, efficient, and good-looking". The EXP would be a personal vehicle for two people with a cargo area in back.

Ford restyled the Escort from the beltline up. The car received a distinctive new rear hatchback and front hood, fenders, and headlights. The rear seats were removed and the area converted into cargo space.

Comparing the EXP to the original 1955–1957 Thunderbird, Ford Division, general manager Louis E. Latalf said, "we're introducing another two-seater with the same flair, but the EXP will be a very affordable, very fuel efficient car matched to the lifestyles of the eighties."

Development took place in Ford's St. Thomas Assembly plant in Ontario, where the majority of EXPs and LN7s and all of both models for the 1982 and 1983 model years were produced. This was also where ongoing experiments and further engineering took place as new technologies became available. The plant produced EXPs from February 16, 1981, to August 5, 1983, and LN7s from February 16, 1981, to June 30, 1983, ending in the 1983 model year for both cars and leaving the American plants to produce all EXPs from 1984 to 1988.

Name origin
According to an article published in Popular Mechanics (March 1981), the letters EXP stand for Erika Project Personal, where project cars are designated X. "Erika" was the code-name from the European Escort.

But it is more likely the abbreviations "EXP" and "LN7" are just different variations on the models they're derivative of: "Escort" and "Lynx".

1980–1981 EXP sales model
A few pre-production EXPs were built just for conceptual design and advertisement. These extremely rare EXPs included many features that would be available in every EXP or LN7. They were all painted in vibrant colors with black painted across the entire car under the door bumper-lines and had a round silver badge where Ford's blue oval would find itself in 1982. These models were distinguished from production models by dual vents towards the front of the hood instead of the vents later seen on the front bumper clips, an absence of bumper strips on the doors, and rear taillights that were completely red where production EXPs had black around the reverse lights. An SS package and bubbleback hatches like that of the LN7 and second generation EXPs were optional, along with black paint around the door windows as seen on second generation EXPs, aluminum oval-spoke wheels, and "1.6 L" badges on the front fenders. At least ten were built in Canada and were all featured in a rare catalog featuring only those cars. No sightings have been recorded since.

The first production EXP and LN7 both rolled off the line on February 16, 1981. The EXP was driven off the line by then Ontario Premier Bill Davis.

Ford expected to build and sell 200,000 EXPs and 70,000 LN7s in the 1982 model year, but only half that number were produced.

First generation (1982–1985)

The EXP's unibody rode on the Escort's  wheelbase, with front-wheel drive, and four-wheel independent suspension from 1970s European Fords. The EXP's wheelbase is also close to the "Fox body" Mustang of the same era, differing by less than an inch in length.

The engine was specifically developed for the North American market of fuel efficiency while the European models of these engines spun faster and made more power. Originally there were to be two available engine options; 1.3 L CVH and a 1.6 L CVH, however the choice was made to only use the larger version. Europe ended up with all the CVH variants while North America only saw the 1.6 and later 1.9 L CVH engines. Also the suspension is that of European Ford Escorts from the 1980s, sharing nearly every part with 1980s North American Escorts. Nevertheless, the March 1981 issue of Car and Driver reported that their EXP with a manual transmission attained  on the highway.

Both the Ford EXP and the Mercury LN7 had a sharply sloped windshield, wheel arches with prominent lips, and wide body side moldings not far below the top of the wheel well. The biggest difference was the rear fascia. The EXP was a notchback with a lift-up hatch, while the LN7 used a big "bubbleback" backlite. The EXP's minimalist grille consisted merely of two horizontal slats on the sloped front panel, while the LN7 had ten. A "bubbleback" glass hatch was also used on the Fox body second generation Mercury Capri. These features made the coefficient of drag low for both the EXP (0.37) and LN7 (0.36), and also helped fuel efficiency.

Priced considerably higher than the Escort, the EXP carried an extensive list of standard equipment. It included power brakes, full instrumentation, full carpeting, map lighting (non-sunroof), electric back window defroster, power hatchback release, a digital clock, a cargo area security shade, and rims that are noticeably wider than those of Escorts. Models with a manual transmission had a sport-tuned exhaust. Automatic models had a wide-open throttle cutout switch for the optional air conditioning compressor clutch. Other options include floor vents and power steering or air conditioning and manual steering, AM/FM radio, cruise control, roof luggage rack, rear window wiper, various seat styles and fabrics, removable sunroof, right hand mirror, TRX tires and suspension, child seat, and a very wide variety of colors inside and out with many various pinstripes and other painted decals.

As the full 1982 model year began, Ford offered an optional (at no extra cost) 4.05:1 final drive for better performance. Later came a close-ratio version of the four-speed transmission with 3.59:1 final drive ratio intended for the same purpose. Ford also offered an  rear brake drum set over the  rear brake drums of other EXPs and Escorts. As the years went on many different rim options became available but the color choices became more limited.

Finally, in March 1982, an  "High Output" (H.O.) version of the CVH engine became available. It had higher (9.0:1) compression, a dual-inlet air cleaner, lower-restriction exhaust, a bifurcated four-into-two-into-one exhaust manifold, larger carburetor venturis (a 32 mm primary and a 34 mm secondary compared to the 32 mm of both venturis in the non-HO engine), and a higher-lift (0.289 mm) camshaft.

Then, in the last week of September 1982, in co-operation with Bosch, Ford Canada assembled the first electronic multi-port fuel-injected (EFI) 1.6 L for the EXP GT and LN7, giving it the distinction of being the first model Ford offered with that option for the US market. The original  engine was no longer available. For buyers in regions of higher elevation the 1.6 L EFI option was replaced with the 1.6 L HO motor, making the 1.6 L EFI even more rare. Also new was a five-speed manual transmission option.

Also new for the 1983 model year were new base seats with knitted rather than solid vinyl, while a new optional "Recaro-style" sport seat had mesh headrests. On the Mercury LN7, the woodgrain on the dash was removed in favor of black plastic, while the instrument graphics were also revised. As was the case for the regular Escort/Lynx, the shifter was moved rearwards while the automatic shifter dropped the unusual dogleg pattern in favor of a more common straight-line arrangement.

Mercury LN7
The Mercury division of Ford Motor Company marketed the EXP as the Mercury LN7, much as the Mercury Lynx was derived from the Ford Escort. While sharing a common powertrain with the EXP, the LN7 differed slightly in its styling. As with the Mercury Capri, the LN7 was styled with a convex-curved "bubbleback" backlite. In addition, the taillights were tinted black and the grille had slightly different styling having ten grille slats compared to the two of the EXP. Engine and transmission developments matched the changes to the EXP.

The LN7 sold far under sales projections and was discontinued after the 1983 model year after approximately 40,000 were sold; compared to the rest of the Lincoln-Mercury model line, a two-seat compact sports coupe was relatively out of place.

TR Performance Package
The biggest option for 1982 with both EXPs and LN7s was the TR package; this would be available on all model years of both. For 1983 the TRX tires also became available mounted onto steel rims.

The TR package featured special Michelin TRX tires of a special metric size of  diameter wheels. These tires performed well, but were made only by Michelin and with an extremely soft rubber compound. All these factors made for sticky cornering but they turn to dust under hard braking and wear fast. TRX tires have generally not been manufactured since the 1990s, meaning that they may no longer be used, even perfectly stored TRX tires are typically found with severe rotting/checking. Due to the nature of the TRX wheels they can't be resized to 14-inch standards either, making the TRX wheels near useless.

The other TR equipment pieces were:
Stiffer valving for the struts (Turbo models had red Konis)
Higher rate front springs (160 lb/in vs standard 120 lb/in)
Larger front swaybar (26 mm vs standard 24 mm, Turbo models are 27 mm)
Stiffer suspension bushings
Higher rate progressive rear springs (320-548 lb/in vs standard 195 lb/in continuous rate)

EXP Turbo Coupe
 By 1984, Ford was trying hard to conquer the youth market, especially the affluent young motorist with offerings such as the Mustang SVO, Thunderbird Turbo Coupe, and the new EXP Turbo Coupe also built by Ford's Special Vehicle Operations (SVO). It shared many parts with the McLaren ASC EXP, including a turbocharged engine, Koni shocks, stiffer springs, lower ride height, improved brakes, and Michelin TRX tires.

In the car's initial development there was a plan for adding fuel injection and a turbocharger to increase power significantly, but there wasn't enough time to get it into the first two production years. The turbocharged 1.6 L CVH engine, available for the Escort and EXP, featured a high-lift camshaft and EEC-IV electronic controls.

The Turbo Coupe had a unique front air dam and rear decklid spoiler, with a taped "Turbo" badge on the rear bumper. It also had two-tone paint with a black lower section, a unique C-pillar appliqué featuring the EXP lettering, black wheel flares, and black rocker panel moldings.

Its only optional features were AC (air conditioning) and removable sunroof. Its transition from 1984 into 1985 included the change from the three-spoke (round-spoke) steering wheel to the two-spoke (square-spoke) steering wheel, the softer two-piece shift knob and vinyl boot to the one-piece shift knob and square rubber boot, and the addition of the (at the time) newly federal-mandated third brake light built into the spoiler (which would be seen on all EXPs from 1986 forward).

Second generation (1985–1988)

By the mid-1980s, two-seat compact sports coupes were in vogue. By 1985, the EXP found competition in the Honda CR-X, Pontiac Fiero, and Toyota MR2. While the latter two were mid-engine, rear-wheel drive vehicles, all were similar to the EXP in deriving a number of powertrain and chassis components from other production vehicles. After four years of production, the first-generation EXP was discontinued during the 1985 model year. Originally marketed towards buyers that valued fuel efficiency over high performance, the Ford EXP had begun to struggle against newer, sportier vehicles. Build quality and refinement were also inferior to its Japanese competitors.

In 1985, a group of Ford assembly employees took an EXP off the line and upgraded it with parts from the updated 1985 Ford Escort. This one-off "prototype" built by the factory workers was presented to Ford CEO Donald Petersen, who liked it and approved it for production, as a "1985" model.

Officially renamed the Ford Escort EXP, the second-generation EXP abandoned the controversial front headlights and widely flared fenders in favor of a version of the bodywork from the standard Ford Escort, sharing its flush-mounted headlamps and amber turn signal lenses. The Escort EXP was given a model-specific front bumper with an integrated air dam; along with the Escort GT, the EXP was produced with its own grille, distinguished by a single slot below the Ford emblem. The rear bodywork remained largely the same; with the exception of the Mercury LN7 "bubble hatch" becoming standard; the grey rear taillamp lenses introduced in 1985 were retained. To match the lowered front bumpers, the rear bumpers were redesigned.

Along with the exterior, the interior of the EXP was redesigned to match the rest of the Ford Escort line.

Luxury Coupe (1985.5–1988) 
The Ford Escort EXP Luxury Coupe was equipped with low-back cloth/vinyl (or all-vinyl) seats (from the standard Ford Escort), AM/FM stereo radio, overhead console, left remote mirror (standard), with a tachometer and trip odometer. From the 1985 introduction to the end of 1986, the Luxury Coupe came with a 1.9 L CVH inline-4 with a 2-barrel carburetor, making . For 1987 and 1988, the 1.9 L engine was equipped with throttle-body fuel injection, termed CFI (Central Fuel Injection) by Ford, while still making .

Sport Coupe (1986–1988) 
Introduced for 1986, the Ford Escort EXP Sport Coupe was produced through 1988. Externally distinguished by 15-inch alloy wheels, dual electric mirrors, and fog lamps, the Sport Coupe was fitted with components from the Ford Escort GT, including suspension and brake upgrades and sport bucket seats. Fitted with a center console, the Sport Coupe was equipped with a systems monitor (with LEDs as warning indicators for headlights, taillights, and fuel level). The Sport Coupe was fitted with a  version of the 1.9 L CVH engine, equipped with multiport fuel injection.

Discontinuation
From its 1982 introduction, sales of the EXP were never as strong as Ford marketing executives had intended. After the introduction of competitive 2-seat vehicles (such as the Pontiac Fiero, Toyota MR2 and Honda CRX), buyers shifted towards higher-performance vehicles. During the 1980s, insurance rates on 2-seat cars were rising over those of cars with back seats, creating a separate deterrent for buyers.

Within Ford, the development of the Ford Mustang played a separate part in the demise of the EXP. In 1982, Ford commenced work on the fourth-generation Mustang; beginning work on a "design of tomorrow", the goal was to shift the Mustang from rear-wheel drive to front-wheel drive, increasing fuel efficiency; in place of the Fox platform, the Mustang was to become a counterpart of the Mazda MX-6. At the time, General Motors was considering a similar redesign of the Chevrolet Camaro and Pontiac Firebird by 1990.

By the mid-1980s, as the public learned of the planned front-wheel drive Mustang, it spawned a negative reaction from buyers and dealers, leading Ford to reconsider the decision. However, as the front-wheel drive car was significantly far along in the development cycle, Ford chose to bring it to production, renaming it Ford Probe (after a series of aerodynamically advanced Ford concept cars). As Ford could not afford the market overlap of producing three compact sports coupes (alongside the Ford Festiva, Ford Escort, and Ford Tempo two-doors), the company chose to discontinue the Escort EXP, as it was the slowest-selling nameplate.

In October 1988, after over 225,000 Ford (Escort) EXPs were produced, the final Ford Escort EXP rolled off the assembly line.

Production

Feature timeline

Variants

EXP and LN7 convertibles
Ford was experimenting with the EXP's potential with the newly released EXPs and LN7s of 1982. A select few of each were turned into convertible models. These models are very rare as Ford did not sell any more than the estimated twenty-eight LN7s and recorded eight EXPs that were produced, not to mention what kind of costs were involved in converting these cars. The eight EXPs were converted by Dynamic Conversions in Hillsdale, Michigan. The 28 LN7s were converted by Andy Hotten's crew in Ford's St Thomas factory where most EXPs and LN7s were built. Very few of these convertible models are reported to be around today.

EXP EV
Further experimentation from Ford with their EXPs resulted in producing four all-electric EXPs. These selected 1982 EXPs are powered by  GE (General Electric) electric motors and Soleq parts all built together by Electric Vehicle Associates (EVA) out of Cleveland, OH. EVA used their technology from the Escorts they made ("EVcorts"). Production of both vehicles were limited as the costs to convert these two cars was far beyond the cars' original values. This idea didn't meet expectations either as these EXPs were lacking both sport and practicality. It's unsure if EVA went on to convert EXPs and Escorts at their own expense.

Many other EXPs would be subject to electric propulsion, but not on Ford's dime. It was a popular competition in colleges, tech schools, and universities to convert smaller cars like EXPs to electric power and then compete against other schools with them. Involved in these competitions were the cars' general performance, endurance, and efficiency.

EXP ASC/McLaren
In 1982 American Sunroof Company (ASC) and McLaren supposedly equipped two EXPs with sunroofs, true notchbacks, ground effects, and charged aspiration. ASC (American Sunroof Corporation) did the cosmetic modifications and McLaren made the performance modifications. One has the following modifications: a supercharger, turbocharger, tighter steering, 1 inch shorter ride height, Recaro racing seats, TRX suspension, KONI shocks, twin fuel pumps, fuel injection, machined uprights (for wheel clearance), enhanced power steering, and portion-valved brakes. Ford already had their own removable sunroofs optional for all EXPs & LN7s but later (1984-1985) added their own ground effects, "bubblebacks", and spoilers to save money and turbocharged EXPs themselves to make the same amount of power. The other EXP has yet to be spotted.

Promotional Specials

LN7 Scoundrel 500
As part of a Weinstock's promotion a select batch of Mercury LN7s were built with all black interior, purple exterior, and gold pinstripes along the body and within the black bump strips. These LN7s had every available factory option and could only be won by sweepstakes entries (not open to Weinstock's or Ford employees). Along with being awarded an LN7, winners were granted a $1000 gift certificate from Weinstock's. If a winner had already ordered an LN7 they could be refunded in full and their ordered LN7 became the Scoundrel Edition car if they so chose. It's assumed that only 500 of these LN7s were ever made.

LN7 Budweiser King
Another promotional sweepstakes event involved some LN7 replicas of the Budweiser Race Team's LN7 funny-car in 1982. Grand prize of the drawing was a normal LN7 (provided by Ford Motor Company) painted to perfectly match the real drag strip car, only one model is known to exist and its whereabouts are unknown. First prizes were tickets to two NHRA national events. Second prizes were four go-cart replicas of the Budweiser funny car, eight others were won at select NHRA events.

Ghia Brezza
The Ghia Brezza was a concept car commissioned by Ford and built by Carrozzeria Ghia. It was based on a Ford EXP chassis. The car was presented at the 1982 Turin Auto Show. It also appeared on the cover of the July 1982 issue of Road & Track magazine.

In 1982 Ford shipped two EXP chassis to Ghia with instructions to create a mid-engined car as a possible answer to the anticipated arrival of the P-car (later Fiero) from General Motors' Pontiac division.

Ghia's managing director, Filippo Sapino, assigned Marilena Corvasce to the project. The Brezza is said to have been the first complete car designed by a female designer. Because of this the Brezza was given the Heritage Vehicle Association's HVA Heritage Award.

As per Ford's instruction, the car is a mid-engined two-seater coupe with glassed-in rear buttresses. The body was an aerodynamic exercise, having flush-mounted windows, skirted rear wheels, fairings in the lower nose ahead of the wheels, and a fully-ducted radiator whose airflow came in through a slot under the nose and was extracted by the airflow under the car. This all resulted in a coefficient of drag of just 0.30.

The coachbuilder created the Brezza's chassis by cutting the two EXP donor chassis, and welding up pieces of each. The car's original powertrain was the EXP's standard 1.6 L CVH engine and automatic transmission, although the engine was later upgraded to a supercharged 1.8 L version.

GN34
At least one first-generation EXP was modified as an early development mule for the 3.0 L SHO V6 engine co-developed between Ford and Yamaha and was part of Ford's GN34 program to develop a mid-engine sports car. Some were made RWD with the Yamaha V6 on display in the rear bubble hatch while others were AWD models with the V6 under the hatch as well. Some V6s were punched from 3.0 to 3.2 to 3.4 to 3.6 liters all mated to a ZF-5 transmissions.

It is unknown how many EXP-based test mules were built; later prototypes were custom-built designs. The GN34 mid-engine sports car was shelved in the late 1980s, with the Ford-Yamaha V6 engine leading to the introduction of the Ford Taurus SHO sports sedan.

Motorsport

PPG CART Indy Car Series Pace Car

1981 LN7
One Mercury LN7 was also converted specifically for the 1981 PPG CART Indy Car World Series. It featured a dramatic front chin spoiler, brake-cooling ducts just ahead of the rear wheels, 14" Apache-5 aluminum wheels, clear headlight and foglight covers (for aero-speed purposes) and a wrap-around rear spoiler all provided by ASC (American Sunroof Company) and Ford.

Suspension also had to be heavily modified to handle  and quick handling of turns. Doing so required a thicker sway-bar, lower ride height, increased spring rate by 15%, Koni shocks all around, and redesigned, fully adjustable rear suspension.

Interior is near factory specifications with the addition multiple warning lights and boost gauge, full roll cage, fuel cell, fire-countermeasures, and ASC/McLaren sport seats with 4-point harnesses.

Outside of the "1982 CART Indy World Series News Media Guide" very few photos of the car exist but it is currently on display in the Roush Racing Museum with the 1982 EXP PPG Pace Car among a few of Ford's GN34 specimens.

1982 EXP
One Ford EXP is one converted specifically serve as a CART Series PPG Indy Car World Series Pace Car in 1982. This car wears a tapered front clip and unique hatch and body-integrated spoiler, both reminiscent of a past EXP prototype. It also is widened at each of the four quarter panels of the car believed to allow room for a Ford-Yamaha SHO V6 in the front or possibly in the rear like the aforementioned GN34 EXP experiment. It is also possible to be host to another 1.6 L CVH built and turbocharged by Jack Roush and Ford's SVO.

Very few photos of the car exist but it is currently on display in the Roush Racing Museum with the 1981 LN7 PPG Pace Car among a few of Ford's GN34 specimens.

SCCA EXP/LN7
Ford provided three EXP/LN7 cars for SCCA competition racing in 1981–1983.

One car was made with PBS. What was previously an LN7 was transformed into a competition race car through fiberglass body parts, racing suspension, and a PBS 2.0 L (Ford 1.6 L) CVH mated with a 5-speed transmission. 

A second car was made into a competition rally car by Blume Power Inc. for driver "Dick Turner" rumored to be RWD and hosting a V8 under the hood.
The third car was another circuit car like the PBS LN7 but little is known about this racer.

References

External links

 Ford EXP recall information at Justia.com

EXP
Compact cars
Hatchbacks
1980s cars
Cars introduced in 1981
Front-wheel-drive sports cars
Motor vehicles manufactured in the United States
Cars discontinued in 1988